Penge Congregational Church is a Congregational church in Penge in the London Borough of Bromley located on Penge High Street between Sainsburys & Tesco Express, on the corner of Kenilworth Road. It is organised under Congregational principles for all who believe in Jesus and is run under a basis of fellowship that includes all members of the church.

It was built 1912 to designs by P. Morley Horder "with passage aisles and clerestory. Shafts on large, excellently carved corbels." The structure appears fortress-like in its Romanesque Revival architectural style massing. Its elevated situation and tower dominate Penge High Street, more so than the stone broach spire of St. John the Evangelist, Penge.

The church currently is in-between Ministers (in an interregnum) but the current Associate Minister is Pam Owen. Sunday Services are at 10:30 a.m. and 6:30 p.m.

Penge Congregational Church is part of the Congregational Federation.

References

Penge
Churches in the London Borough of Bromley
Churches completed in 1912
20th-century Protestant churches
Romanesque Revival church buildings in England
1912 establishments in England
20th-century churches in the United Kingdom